Hampstead is a community in Hampstead Parish, New Brunswick New Brunswick Canada. It was settled by Loyalists from New York in 1786 and was named for Hempstead, New York.

History

Notable people

Don Mogard

See also
List of communities in New Brunswick

References

Communities in Queens County, New Brunswick
Local service districts of Queens County, New Brunswick